The John W. Campbell Memorial Award for Best Science Fiction Novel, or Campbell Memorial Award, was an annual award presented to the author of the best science fiction novel published in English in the preceding calendar year. It was given by several organizations from 1973-1979 and then by the Center for the Study of Science Fiction at the University of Kansas until 2019. It is the novel counterpart of the Theodore Sturgeon Award for best short story, awarded at the same conference by the Theodore Sturgeon Literary Trust. The award is named in honor of John W. Campbell (1910–1971), whose science fiction writing and role as editor of Analog Science Fiction and Fact made him one of the most influential editors in the early history of science fiction. The award was established in 1973 by writers and critics Harry Harrison and Brian Aldiss "as a way of continuing his efforts to encourage writers to produce their best possible work." Locus magazine has listed it as one of the "major awards" of written science fiction.

The winning novel is selected by a panel of science fiction experts, intended to be "small enough to discuss among its members all of the nominated novels". Among members of the panel have been Gregory Benford, Paul A. Carter, James Gunn, Elizabeth Anne Hull, Christopher McKitterick, Farah Mendlesohn, Pamela Sargent, and Tom Shippey. In 2008 Mendlesohn was replaced with Paul Kincaid, in 2009 Carter left the panel while Paul Di Filippo and Sheila Finch joined, and Lisa Yaszek replaced Di Filippo in 2016. Nominations are submitted by publishers and jurors, and are collated by the panel into a list of finalists to be voted on. The minimum eligible length that a work may be is not formally defined by the center. The winner is selected by May of each year, and was for a number of years presented during the Campbell Conference awards banquet in Lawrence as part of the centerpiece of the conference along with the Sturgeon Award. The award was given at this conference since 1979; prior to then it was awarded at various locations around the world, starting at the Illinois Institute of Technology in 1973. Winners are always invited to attend the ceremony. James Gunn had maintained a trophy which records all of the winners on engraved plaques affixed to the sides, and since 2004 winners have received a smaller personalized trophy as well. In 2019, McKitterick (the award's chair) announced plans to rename both the conference and the award. Both the conference and the award were cancelled in 2020, 2021, and 2022 due to the COVID-19 pandemic.

During the 47 years the award has been active, 183 authors have had works nominated; 47 of these authors have won. In two years, 1976 and 1994, the panel selected none of the nominees as a winner, while in 1974, 2002, 2009, and 2012 the panel selected two winners rather than one. Frederik Pohl and Joan Slonczewski have each won twice, the only authors to do so, out of four and two nominations, respectively. Kim Stanley Robinson and Paul J. McAuley have won once out of seven nominations, and Jack McDevitt, Ian McDonald, Adam Roberts, and Robert J. Sawyer have won once out of five nominations, while Nancy Kress, Bruce Sterling, and Robert Charles Wilson have won once out of four nominations. Greg Bear has the most nominations without winning at nine, followed by Sheri S. Tepper at six, James K. Morrow at five, and William Gibson, Ken MacLeod, Charles Stross, and Peter Watts at four.

Winners and nominees
In the following table, the years correspond to the date of the ceremony, rather than when the novel was first published. Each year links to the corresponding "year in literature". Entries with a blue background and an asterisk (*) next to the writer's name have won the award; those with a white background are the other nominees on the shortlist. Entries with a gray background and a plus sign (+) indicate a year where no novel was selected as the winner.

  *   Winners
  +   No winner selected

References

External links
 

1973 establishments in the United States
Academic science fiction awards
American literary awards
Awards established in 1973

Lists of speculative fiction-related award winners and nominees